Anani Yavashev (18 October 1932 – 5 February 2022) was a Bulgarian actor. His younger brother was the installation artist Christo. Anani Yavashev appeared in more than forty films since 1959. He died on 5 February 2022, at the age of 89.

Selected filmography

References

External links
 

1932 births
2022 deaths
20th-century Bulgarian male actors
Bulgarian male film actors
Bulgarian male television actors
People from Gabrovo